The Battle of Zaragoza was a battle during the Mexican Revolution, and was fought in late November 1913, a few days following the Battle of Tierra Blanca. Pancho Villa's trusted commander, the American soldier of fortune, E.L Holmdahl attacked the camp of a group of Huertist who were raiding rebel territory from the US. Holmdahl, despite being outnumbered, attacked and trapped, the enemy, killing 172, while the remaining 28 were executed by his men, against Holmdahl's orders.

Battle

A few days after the Battle of Tierra Blanca, Villa's subordinate the American soldier of fortune E.L Holmdahl led a patrol of forty mounted men through the desert south east of Juárez, searching for a band of Huerta troops who were raiding Villa's supply lines. Based in the Texas border town of Ysleta, fifteen miles east of EL Paso, the band crossed the Rio Grande into Mexico on daring raid and then fled back to Safety in Texas.

Holmdahl was tipped off to the whereabouts of the raiders by an US army officer, who was an old comrade in the 20th Infantry Regiment, now stationed in El Paso. They were patrolling the area in order to protect the border cities from bandits, which would ultimately lead to the Bandit War two years later. With this information, Holmdahl was able to slip up on the group's camp at dawn, near the town of Zaragoza and, although there were at least 200 federals, Holmdahl struck hard and fast.

By positioning his men between the Federal camp and the river, Holmdahl's surprise attack cut off the enemies escape route and scattered most of the bands towards the river town of Zaragoza. Riding into town, Holmdahl was hit with a rifle bullet entering the top of his shoulder blade near the base of his neck and coming out beneath the shoulder blade. Knocked out of the saddle, Holmdahl fell into the dusty street of Zaragoza. Laying there he watched his infuriated men shoot many of the raiders out of their saddles and overrun and capture 28 of them, while the remaining 172, unable to flee were killed in the engagement. His men however, believing their commander dead, lined the prisoners against an adobe building wall and shot them.

Aftermath

The wounded Holmdahl was taken to El Paso, where under the care of American doctors, he again demonstrated his recovering ability and returned to the front.

References

Sources
Meed, Douglas (2003). Soldier of Fortune: Adventuring in Latin America and Mexico with Emil Lewis Holmdahl. Houston, Texas: Halycon Press Ltd.
Guzmán, Luis Guzmán. Memoirs of Pancho Villa.
Chisholm, Hugh, ed. (1911). "Chihuahua (city)" . Encyclopædia Britannica. Vol. 6 (11th ed.). Cambridge University Press.

Mexican Revolution
1913 in Mexico
November 1913 events
Battles of the Mexican Revolution